Duggleby is a hamlet in the Ryedale district of North Yorkshire, England. It was historically part of the East Riding of Yorkshire until 1974.

Duggleby is part of the civil parish of Kirby Grindalythe, which had a population of 247 in 92 households at the time of the 2001 census. The village lies in the Great Wold Valley and the course of the winterbourne stream the Gypsey Race passes through it.

To the south-east of the hamlet is Duggleby Howe, one of the largest round barrows in Britain.

References

External links

Villages in North Yorkshire